Devil Rejectz 2: House of the Dead is a collaboration album between American rappers Ampichino and The Jacka.  It peaked at #83 on the R&B/Hip-Hop Albums chart. Devil Rejectz 2: House of the Dead includes guest appearances from T-Nutty, Yukmouth, Mistah F.A.B., Berner and Rydah J. Klyde, amongst other artists.

A music video has been filmed for the song "Hustle In the Rain" featuring Husalah & T-Nutty.

Track listing

References

2010 albums
Collaborative albums
The Jacka albums
Sequel albums